Marie "Mimmi" Wikstedt (born 30 April 1954) is a former professional tennis player from Sweden.

Biography
Wikstedt, who is known by her nickname "Mimmi", was born in Stockholm. She began competing in the early 1970s and made her debut for the Sweden Fed Cup team in 1973. Most of her Fed Cup matches came in doubles.

Her best grand slam performances came on the grass courts at Wimbledon. She made the mixed doubles quarter-finals with Ernie Ewert in 1975, won the Wimbledon Plate in 1976, reached the women's doubles quarter-finals with Jane Stratton in 1977 and made the third round of the singles in 1979. At the 1979 Australian Open she was quarter-finalist in the women's doubles partnering Renata Tomanova.

From the late 1970s she competed on the WTA Tour, most prominently as a doubles player. Her best performance in singles was a semi-final appearance at the 1978 Christchurch International. She won the doubles title at the 1982 Avon Championships of Nashville with Chris O'Neil.

She made her last Fed Cup appearance for Sweden in 1981 and finished with an 11/10 overall record, from 18 ties.

Now living in Bastad, Wikstedt remains involved in tennis as a coach.

WTA Tour finals

Doubles (1–1)

References

External links
 
 
 

1954 births
Living people
Swedish female tennis players
Tennis players from Stockholm
20th-century Swedish women
21st-century Swedish women